Stojan Vranješ (Serbian Cyrillic: Стојан Врањеш; born 11 October 1986) is a Bosnian professional footballer who plays as a midfielder.

Club career

Early career
Vranješ started his career at his hometown club Borac Banja Luka. There, he spent a total of five seasons, before moving to Romania, where he played for Pandurii and CFR Cluj.

Vojvodina
On 6 February 2013, Vranješ signed a two-year contract with Serbian giants Vojvodina. He scored his first goal for Vojvodina in a 2–1 win against Smederevo on 27 February 2013. He scored a goal from distance in a 3–0 win against Donji Srem on 19 March 2013, which Donji Srem manager Bogić Bogićević dubbed a "euro-goal".

Adventure in Poland
In February 2014, Vranješ was transferred from Vojvodina to Polish club Lechia Gdańsk for 200,000 Euros. After impressing at Lechia, scoring 16 goals in 52 appearances, he was transferred to Legia Warsaw on 29 August 2015. While at Legia, Vranješ won both the Ekstraklasa and Polish Cup in 2016. On 9 January 2017, shortly after leaving Legia, he signed a contract with Piast Gliwice. On 15 January 2018, Vranješ left the club after not having enough playing time in that season. Both sides said they are on good terms still to this day.

Željezničar
On 23 January 2018, Vranješ signed a one and a half-year deal with Bosnian Premier League club Željezničar. On 9 May 2018, he won the Bosnian Cup after Željezničar beat Krupa in the two legged final of that season's cup. On 31 January 2019, Vranješ left Željezničar.

Return to Borac
On 1 February 2019, 9 years after leaving the club, Vranješ once again became the new player of Borac in the First League of RS. He made his official debut for Borac on 27 February 2019, in a 2–1 away loss in a cup game against Široki Brijeg.
 
In the 2018–19 First League of RS season, Vranješ's Borac 5 games before the end of the season won the league title and got promoted back to the Bosnian Premier League. On 12 January 2020, he extended his contract with the club until the summer of 2023.

Vranješ won his first league title with Borac on 23 May 2021, one game before the end of the 2020–21 season, getting crowned Bosnian Premier League champions.

He terminated his contract with Borac and left the club in November 2021.

Bashundhara Kings
On 20 November 2021,Vranješ joined Bangladesh Premier League team Bashundhara Kings for the 2021–22 season.

International career
Vranješ made his senior debut for Bosnia and Herzegovina on 1 June 2009, against Uzbekistan.

On 31 May 2012, Vranješ was at the center of a media storm for a mistake he made in a friendly match in Chicago against Mexico, which resulted in a last-minute goal for Mexico, who won 2–1.

Personal life
Vranješ has a younger brother, Ognjen, who is also a professional footballer.

Career statistics

International

Honours
Borac Banja Luka
Bosnian Premier League: 2020–21
Bosnian Cup: 2009–10
First League of RS: 2018–19

CFR Cluj  
Romanian League: 2011–12

Vojvodina   
Serbian Cup: 2013–14

Legia Warsaw    
Ekstraklasa: 2015–16 2016-17
Polish Cup: 2015–16

Željezničar     
Bosnian Cup: 2017–18

References

External links

1986 births
Living people
Sportspeople from Banja Luka
Bosnia and Herzegovina footballers
Bosnia and Herzegovina under-21 international footballers
Association football midfielders
Bosnia and Herzegovina international footballers
Serbs of Bosnia and Herzegovina
FK Borac Banja Luka players
CS Pandurii Târgu Jiu players
CFR Cluj players
FK Vojvodina players
Lechia Gdańsk players
Legia Warsaw players
Piast Gliwice players
FK Željezničar Sarajevo players
Premier League of Bosnia and Herzegovina players
Liga I players
Serbian SuperLiga players
Ekstraklasa players
First League of the Republika Srpska players
Expatriate footballers in Romania
Expatriate footballers in Poland
Bosnia and Herzegovina expatriate sportspeople in Poland
Bosnia and Herzegovina expatriate sportspeople in Romania